Sten Sture Tolgfors (born 17 July 1966 in Forshaga) is a Swedish former politician, public affairs executive and government official who is serving as Governor of Västra Götaland County since 1 September 2022, having been appointed to the position on 9 June 2022.

He served as Minister of Commerce and Industry 2006-2007 and as Minister for Defence from 2007 until his resignation in 2012. He was a Member of the Swedish Parliament for Örebro County from 1994 to 2013.

Early life and career 
Tolgfors was born in Forshaga as the son of Sture and Anna Brita Kajsa Tolgfors but was raised in Åmål. He lives in Örebro with his wife and children. Tolgfors has a B.A. in political science from the University of Örebro, and has a background in the Red Cross.

In local politics he served in the Örebro City Council from 1991 to 1994. He was a political adviser in the Ministry of Defense from 1992 to 1993, and in the Ministry of Enterprise from 1993 to 1994.

He is a conscientious objector, meaning that he refused to carry arms when called to Swedish mandatory military service. He served in the Red Cross instead of doing the military service.

However, he changed his mind completely when he saw a few photos from Saddam Hussein's massacre of Iraqi Kurds.

A survey conducted by Swedish radio news in November 2008 among local party chairman for the four Alliance parties, showed that Tolgfors was the most unpopular minister in the government.

Political Appointments
As a Member of Parliament he has been a member of the Committee on Foreign Affairs and of the Committee on Enterprise from 1994 to 1998.

Since then he has been a member of the Committee on Education from 1998 to 2002, and again from 2003 to 2006.

He was a member of the Committee on Social Insurance from 2002 to 2003.

Since 2003 he has been a member of the executive board of the Moderate Party. From 2002 to 2003 he was the party's refugee policy spokesman and was later the party's education policy representative between 2003 and 2006.

For a short period after the 2006 general election and before his appointment as Minister of Commerce and Industry, Tolgfors was chairman of the Committee on Foreign Affairs.

Tolgfors has consistently been involved in bullying issues during his parliamentary period, and considers among other things, that schools should use research-based program that provides proven efficacy.

He has also campaigned in favor of people with disabilities to a school that is tailored to their needs.

Minister of Commerce and Industry 
On 24 October 2006, Tolgfors was appointed Minister of Commerce and Industry, succeeding Maria Borelius.

He left office on 12 September 2007 when he succeeded Mikael Odenberg as Minister for Defence. Odenberg had resigned in protest to the government's defence cuts.

Minister for Defence 
Tolgfors completed the transition from invasion to operational defense and among other things, abolished conscription.

He has also brought the Swedish Armed Forces on his policies, and also implemented the reforms (he wanted).

He is the first Minister for Defence who has managed to balance the budget of the Swedish Armed Forces.

He was also the only minister of defence worldwide that was a conscientious objector[of what? not clear] and thus he was not popular among high officers .

Resignation 
Tolgfors received negative attention in March 2012 over the way he dealt with the issue concerning the so-called Project Simoom.
Later the same day Tolgfors was registered by Gustav Fridolin to the Constitution Committee on plans for a weapons factory in Saudi Arabia.

A scandal ensued, and on 29 March 2012, Tolgfors resigned.

Later career 
Tolgfors submitted his resignation from the Swedish Parliament on 25 January 2013. He left his seat on 31 January 2013 and was succeeded by Lotta Olsson.

Tolgfors quickly moved from his position as a minister to become an arms lobbyist at the public affairs agency Rud Pedersen - with less than six months between his resignation and his new job. As a result Tolgfors drew heavy criticism.

References

External links 
 Sten Tolgfors at the Riksdag website 
 Sten Tolgfors at the Moderate Party website 

1966 births
Living people
People from Forshaga Municipality
Members of the Riksdag from the Moderate Party
Swedish Ministers for Trade
Swedish Ministers for Defence
Recipients of the Order of the Cross of Terra Mariana, 1st Class
Members of the Riksdag 2002–2006
Örebro University alumni